Poplar Grove may refer to:

Poplar Grove, Howard County, Indiana, an unincorporated community
Poplar Grove, Indianapolis, a neighborhood of Indianapolis